Listopadovka is a rural locality (a selo) and the administrative center of Listopadovskoye Rural Settlement, Gribanovsky  District, Voronezh Oblast, Russia. The population was 2,286 as of 2010. There are 12 streets.

Geography 
Listopadovka is located 44 km west of Gribanovsky (the district's administrative centre) by road. Krasovka is the nearest rural locality.

References 

Rural localities in Gribanovsky District